Manvydas or Monwid (died in 1348?) was the eldest son of Gediminas, Grand Duke of Lithuania, and inherited Kernavė and Slonim after his father's death in 1341. Nothing else is known about his life. Matthias of Neuenburg mentioned that two sons of Gediminas perished in the Battle of Strėva in February 1348. One was Narimantas and the other is believed to be Manvydas.

See also 
 Family of Gediminas – family tree of Manvydas
 Gediminids

References
 
 

1348 deaths
Gediminids
Year of birth uncertain